The Term and Quarter Days (Scotland) Act 1990 is an Act of the Parliament of the United Kingdom which defined the dates of the Scottish Term and Quarter Days. These are customary divisions of the legal year when contracts traditionally begin and end and payments are due. It received Royal Assent on 13 July 1990 and immediate commencement, with the dates of the days changing twelve months later. The changes arose from a Scottish Law Commission Report on the Scottish Term and Quarter Days.

Substantive Provisions
Section 1 of the Act defines the four quarter days as Candlemas on 28 February, Whitsunday on 28 May, Lammas on 28 August and Martinmas on 28 November, with Whitsunday and Martinmas being the two term days. This Act provides that any lease, agreement or undertaking, whether written or oral, which contains a specific or general reference to a term or quarter day, including those concluded before the change, shall be understood as referring to the new definitions of the days (i.e. as 28 February/May/August/November).

Where it was intended in a contract concluded prior to the passing of the Act that a reference to a term or quarter day was intended to refer specifically to the previous date of that day rather than the term or quarter day generally, it is possible under sub-section (5) to apply to the Sheriff to have the reference interpreted in this way. The Sheriff's decision in this application is final.

Under sub-section (7), where a reference is made to one of the term of quarter days and the date of this day is incorrectly specified in the contract in terms of the Act (i.e. not as 28 February/May/August/November), the date actually specified in the contract is to be used rather than that in the Act.

The Act also repealed the Removings Act 1693, an Act of the old Parliament of Scotland, which had previously defined the dates of the term and quarter days.

The Term and Quarter Days:
 28 February
 28 May
 28 August
 28 November

See also
 List of Acts of the Parliament of the United Kingdom, 1980–1999
 Scottish term days

Notes

External links
 The Act as currently in force

United Kingdom Acts of Parliament 1990
Scottish culture
Acts of the Parliament of the United Kingdom concerning Scotland
1990 in Scotland